The Hangor-class submarines are a class of diesel–electric attack submarines currently being manufactured by a joint-partnership of the China Shipbuilding Industry Corporation (CSIC) and the Karachi Shipyard & Engineering Works (KSEW) for the Pakistan Navy (PN). Eponymously christened after the former-Daphné-class submarines that the PN operated between 1970 and 2006, the class is an export derivative of the Chinese-origin Type 039A/041 attack submarine, currently operated by the People's Liberation Army Navy (PLAN). First unveiled to the public in 2018, the future submarines are envisaged to undertake anti-access/area denial operations within Pakistan's exclusive economic zone, through the use of heavyweight torpedoes and anti-ship cruising missiles.

Pakistan's Ministry of Defence (MoD) ordered eight submarines from China in 2015, at an approximate cost of USD $4-5 billion, making it the largest arms export contract in China's military history. Of the eight ordered examples, the initial four are being built by CSIC while the latter four are to be built by KSEW, under a technology transfer agreement. The first four vessels, built by China, are expected to be delivered by 2023, while the latter four, which are to built by Pakistan, are expected to be delivered between 2025 and 2028, at the rate of one delivery per year.

History

Background 
Since the dissolution of British rule in the Indian subcontinent in 1947, Pakistan and India engaged each other in a series of armed conflicts in 1947-48, 1965, 1971 and in 1999. Of the aforementioned conflicts, the Pakistan Navy (PN) and its eastern counterpart, the Indian Navy confronted each other twice, in 1971 and in 1999, with the use of submarine assets playing an important role in both conflicts. During both episodes and again in 2001, the Indian Navy orchestrated a slew of naval blockades against Pakistan in the Arabian Sea, which adversely affected the PN's ability to facilitate anti-access operations. Following the conclusion of the 2001 conflict, the PN noted that its ability to enforce naval deterrence with the use of its submarines was adversely inadequate, which consequently instigated an exigency to augment the submarine fleet with newer boats. 

In 2008, the PN approached several naval conglomerates, namely DCNS (now Naval Group) and Howaldtswerke-Deutsche Werft (HDW), with the intention of purchase a series of attack submarines. While DCNS offered its Marlin-class submarine, HDW offered its Type 214 submarine. The same year, Pakistan agreed to purchase three Type 214 submarines at a then-estimated cost of € 773.7 million. However, owing to a dearth of public funds due to the 2009 global financial crisis and the high cost of the submarines forced Pakistan to terminate the proposed deal.

In 2011, Pakistan initiated negotiations with the China Shipbuilding & Offshore International (CSOC) - the trade arm of the Chinese state-owned China Shipbuilding Industry Corporation (CSIC), for the purchase of six diesel-powered attack submarines equipped with air-independent propulsion systems (AIP). Although no details were ever revealed about the design of the speculated submarines, many observers surmised that the design in question may have been the Type 032 Qing-class submarine, a variant of the Type 039A/041 Yuan-class submarine.

Purchase 
In April 2015, during a briefing to the National Assembly Standing Committee on Defence, PN representatives disclosed that the Pakistani government, then headed by prime minister Nawaz Sharif, had approved the purchase of eight attack submarines from China, at an estimated cost of USD $4-5 billion. Although no details regarding the approved submarines were disclosed, officials disclosed that Pakistan had been looking at an export design of the Yuan-class, denoted as the S20. In October of the same year, Pakistan's minister of defense production Rana Tanveer Hussain announced that the deal for the eight submarines had been finalized, dislosing that four of the vessels would be built in China and Pakistan, respectively. 

One year later, in April 2016, the PN publicly disclosed that the Karachi Shipyard & Engineering Works (KSEW) had been selected as the Pakistani shipyard tasked with the production of the four submarines. Six months later, in October 2016, the director of the CSIC confirmed the sale of the submarines to Pakistan during an interview with the Chinese state-run People's Daily Online media outlet. The total cost of the deal, which had then been estimated at a total USD $4-5 billion, interpreted an approximate cost of $500 million per submarine, although other sources have argued that the actual price could be lower, at $250-325 million per submarine.

Design

S26 design
Although no information regarding the design characteristics of the class were ever revealed, it is thought that the submarine's design is likely based on the S26, an export-centric design developed by the CSOC that draws on the Type 039A/041 submarine. The S26 in turn is thought to be an AIP-equipped variant of the S20 diesel-electric submarine design unveiled by the China Shipbuilding Trading Corporation (CSSC) in 2013. In addition to the PN, the Royal Thai Navy (RTN) also ordered three examples of the S26 (locally designated as the S26T) in 2017.

The design's teardrop-shaped hull can accommodate a crew complement of 38, plus 8 additional special forces personnel. The entire hull is built from continuously-cast 921A and 980 steel (with yield strengths of 590-745 MPa and 785 MPa), while the hull-sections are assembled using modular construction methodology. Altogether, the S-26 is divided into six compartments: the first being the weapons and fore battery compartment, followed by the command compartment, the living quarters and aft battery compartment, the diesel-engine and generator compartment, the AIP compartment, and the shaft machinery and driving motor compartment.

Propulsion
For propulsion, the S26 originally utilized four MTU 12V 396 SE84 marine engines, manufactured by MTU Friedrichshafen. However, following a 2021 discovery revealing the dual-use of the German-made MTU engines on Chinese warships, in spite of a European Union-imposed embargo restricting the sale of military technology to China, the export of the engines to both the submarines of both the PN and the RTN were consequently blocked. As an alternative to the MTU 12V 396 SE84, the CSOC reportedly offered an Chinese-made engine, dubbed the CHD620. Although it is currently unclear if the RTN has accepted the CHD620, several sources have reported that the PN had tested and accepted the engine.

In addition to the engines, the submarines are also set to be equipped with a Stirling-powered air-independent propulsion (AIP), developed by CSIC’s 711th Institute. The maximum range for mixed AIP and diesel-electric travel is 2000nm, or 65 days.

Armament 
Although little-to-no public information regarding the armament of the submarines is available, it is surmised that the Hangor-class will feature six 533mm torpedo tubes, mirroring the S26 design. Similar to the armament capabilities of the Yuan-class, the submarines will be able to launch both heavyweight torpedoes and anti-ship missiles (AShM). Of the two mentioned ordnance, it is assumed the submarine would eventually carry the Chinese-origin Yu-6 heavyweight torpedoes or the CM-708UNB sub-launched anti-ship missile (AShM). In addition to the aforementioned two, the eight submarines are also widely expected to carry the Pakistan-developed nuclear-capable Babur-3 submarine-launched cruise missile (SLCM), capable of covering a 450 km range. Some sources have postulated that the move to field the Babur-3 on the submarines could be a possible attempt by Pakistan to develop an assured second-strike nuclear deterrence capability capable of rivalling India's naval second-strike capabilities.

Naming 
In January 2017, Admiral Muhammad Zakaullah, the-then PN Chief of Naval Staff, announced that the eight future submarines would be eponymously christened as the Hangor-class, after PNS Hangor (S131), a Daphné-class submarine which the PN had used to sink INS Khukri, a Blackwood-class frigate of the Indian Navy, during the Indo-Pakistani naval hostilities of 1971. In December 2021, the PN revealed that the first submarine of the batch being built by Pakistan would be named as the Tasnim, after Vice Admiral Ahmad Tasnim, a retired PN officer who had commanded the original Hangor (S131) when it sank Khukri.

Construction

Infrastructure
Following the finalization of the deal in 2015, several sources postulated that the four submarines to be built by Pakistan would be constructed at the PN's Submarine Rebuild Complex (SRC) in Ormara. However, no significant construction work was ever observed there. Between 2015 and 2016, open-source intelligence inputs revealed that KSEW had expanded its infrastructure capabilities at its Karachi facility, indicating that the submarines would be built there. Prior to the deal for the eight submarines, KSEW had also built two of its three French-designed Agosta-90B submarines, namely Saad and Hamza, at its facilities between 2002 and 2008.

Incidentally, the construction halls are placed close to the PN's main submarine berths at the Pakistan Naval Dockyard.

In October 2020, Zafar Mahmood Abbasi, the PN's then-Chief of Naval Staff, disclosed that the PN would acquire one Type 039A submarine from PLAN on a gratis basis (i.e., at no additional charge) for training and acclimation purposes.

Progress
The construction progress of the eight submarines were never revealed by the PN or the CSIC; nevertheless, it is expected that the first four vessels being built by the CSIC would be delivered between 2023 and 2024, while the latter four, which being built by KSEW, are expected to be delivered between 2025 and 2028, at the rate of one delivery per year.

The only known public information about the construction progress was revealed in December 2021, when KSEW announced that it had conducted a steel-cutting ceremony for the Tasnim, the first submarine of its batch. The keel for the Tasnim was laid nearly a year later in December 2022.

Ships in the class 
(Note :- The submarines' names are yet to be revealed entirely)

See also 
Other submarines of notable comparison
 Type 214 submarine - A class of export-oriented diesel-electric attack-submarines, also developed by ThyssenKrupp Marine Systems and currently operated by the navies of Greece, Portugal, South Korea and Turkey.
 Type 212 submarine - A class of diesel-electric attack-submarines developed by ThyssenKrupp Marine Systems and exclusively built for the navies of Germany, Italy and Norway.
  - A class of export-oriented diesel-electric attack-submarines, jointly developed by Naval Group and Navantia and currently operated by the navies of Chile, Malaysia, India and Brazil.
  - A class of diesel-electric attack-submarines, built by Mitsubishi Heavy Industries and operated by Japan.
  - A class of conventionally-powered submarines operated by the navies of Russia, China, India, Myanmar, Vietnam, Iran, Poland, Algeria and Romania.

Other references to the Pakistan Navy
List of active ships in the Pakistan Navy.
Agosta-class submarine - A series of diesel-electric attack-submarines designed by Naval Group and currently in active service with the Pakistan Navy.

References 

Submarine classes